Inspired Abandon is an album by American jazz trombonist Lawrence Brown with Johnny Hodges featuring performances recorded in 1965 for the Impulse! label. The album was rereleased on CD as bonus tracks on the American CD reissue of Everybody Knows Johnny Hodges.

Reception
The Allmusic review awarded the album 4 stars.

Track listing
All compositions by Johnny Hodges except as indicated
 "Stompy Jones" (Duke Ellington) - 3:57  
 "Mood Indigo" (Ellington, Barney Bigard) - 4:22  
 "Good Queen Bess" - 3:05  
 "Little Brother" - 5:14  
 "Jeep's Blues" (Ellington, Hodges) - 5:40  
 "Do Nothin' Till You Hear From Me" (Ellington) - 2:33  
 "Ruint" (Ellington, Hodges) - 3:18  
 "Sassy Cue" - 3:39 
Recorded at Van Gelder Studios, Englewood Cliffs, New Jersey on March 8, 1965

Personnel
Lawrence Brown – trombone
Johnny Hodges - alto saxophone
Ray Nance - cornet
Cat Anderson - trumpet (tracks 1 & 3-8)
Buster Cooper - trombone (tracks 1 & 3-8)
Jimmy Hamilton - clarinet (tracks 1 & 3-8) 
Russell Procope - alto saxophone, clarinet
Harold Ashby, Paul Gonsalves - tenor saxophone (tracks 1 & 3-8)
Jimmy Jones - piano 
Richard Davis  – bass
Gus Johnson (tracks 1, 3 & 5-8), Johnny Hodges Jr. (tracks 2 & 4) – drums

References

Impulse! Records albums
Lawrence Brown (jazz trombonist) albums
Johnny Hodges albums
1965 albums